Avenida Vicente Guerrero is the principal north-south avenue in  Nuevo Laredo, Tamaulipas, Mexico. Downtown Nuevo Laredo runs throughout the whole avenue. The avenue is the starting point for Mexican Federal Highway 85. It was named after Vicente Guerrero a Mexican historical figure. The avenue is considered the main "strip", which is filled with tourist shops, restaurants, night clubs and bars (most accept US dollars in addition to Mexican pesos). Avenida Vicente Guerrero is filled with many plazas and monuments. Avenida Guerrero is a two-lane, one-way street running from north to south.  Avenida Vicente Guerrero north terminus is on Gateway to the Americas International Bridge to Convent Street in Laredo, Texas. Its southern terminus is on Avenida Reforma.

Establishments 
Many establishments are located on or by Avenida Vicente Guerrero. Many include Cananas Revolution Bar, La Mina Bar & Liquor Store, 57th Street, Cadillac Bar, Afrika, Willy's and The Mercado. Various pharmacists include Calderon, Farmacia Guadalajara, Fenix, Farmacias Benavides and locally owned pharmacists.

Financial Institutions 
Many financial institutions are on Avenida Vicente Guerrero for example: HSBC, Banco Santander, BBVA Bancomer and Banamex.

Gallery

References

Nuevo Laredo
Streets in Mexico
Transportation in Tamaulipas